Surjan Singh Jolly, fondly known as Chef Jolly, is the Executive Chef at JW Marriott, Bengaluru.  He started his career in 1993 at Taj, New Delhi as the Chef de Partie.  Chef Jolly has been in the hospitality industry for over two decades. His recent achievements include having his own show on Zee Khana Khazana Channel titled "Ab Har Koi Chef". He was also chosen as the Head Chef for Paris Hilton when she visited India  and has been the Guest Chef on the reality television show MasterChef India. He was judge on the first season of Junior Master Chef India.

References

External links
 

Year of birth missing (living people)
Living people
Indian television chefs
Businesspeople from Amritsar